Ronald 'Boris' Duncan CPhys (born 4 September 1962) is a former British alpine skier who competed on the annual FIS Alpine Ski World Cup circuit from 1981-1993, at four FIS Alpine World Ski Championships and at the 1988 Winter Olympics in Calgary and the 1992 Winter Olympics in Albertville. He set up  @UK PLC in 1999.

Sporting career
In 1980 and 1983, Duncan was the British men's downhill champion. He was also the men's Super-G champion in 1991 and men's combined champion in 1983 and 1991. 
Duncan's best finish on the world cup circuit was in the downhill on 15 March 1990, when he finished in 13th place at Are in Sweden.

At the 1988 Winter Olympics, Duncan finished 37th in the men's downhill and 'did not finish' the men's combined. In the 1992 Winter Olympics he finished 31st in the men's downhill, 40th in the men's Super-G and 'did not finish' the men's combined.

From 2002-04 Duncan was the chairman of the British Ski and Snowboard Federation, trading as Snowsport GB, the governing body for skiing and snowboarding in Great Britain.

Business career
Duncan is the co-founder and chairman of @UK PLC. Previously, he ran a computer software consultancy. In 2014 and 2015 he was shortlisted for Entrepreneur of the Year, at the Grant Thornton Quoted Company Awards.

See also
1992 Alpine Skiing World Cup – Men's Downhill

References

External links

1962 births
Living people
British male alpine skiers
Scottish male alpine skiers
Olympic alpine skiers of Great Britain
Alpine skiers at the 1988 Winter Olympics
Alpine skiers at the 1992 Winter Olympics
Alumni of Magdalene College, Cambridge
People educated at Strathallan School